The 2016 Japanese motorcycle Grand Prix was the fifteenth round of the 2016 MotoGP season. It was held at the Twin Ring Motegi in Motegi on 16 October 2016.

MotoGP race report
In the MotoGP class, both factory Yamaha riders crashed out of the race, thus marking their first double retirement since the 2011 British Grand Prix.

Classification

MotoGP
With Andrea Iannone still recovering from the injuries sustained at Misano, he was replaced in the factory Ducati team by Héctor Barberá. Australian Superbike rider Mike Jones made his MotoGP debut filling in for Barbera at Avintia Racing.

Dani Pedrosa suffered a broken collarbone in a crash during Friday practice and was replaced by Honda test rider Hiroshi Aoyama for the rest of the weekend.

Moto2

 Miguel Oliveira withdrew after the first practice session due to effects of the broken collarbone suffered at Aragon GP.

Moto3

Championship standings after the race (MotoGP)
Below are the standings for the top five riders and constructors after round fifteen has concluded.

Riders' Championship standings

Constructors' Championship standings

 Note: Only the top five positions are included for both sets of standings.

Notes

References

2016 MotoGP race reports
Motorcycle Grand Prix
2016
Japanese motorcycle Grand Prix